Philadelphus delavayi is a deciduous shrub in the genus Philadelphus, native to China, Tibet, and Upper Burma.  It was discovered by Pierre Jean Marie Delavay in 1887.  It has an upright growth habit, to a height of 3 metres, with arching branches and ovate, tapered, sometimes toothed, dark green leaves up to 10 cm or more long.  It bears racemes of 5-9 cup shaped, single, very fragrant creamy-white flowers, 2.5 cm across.

References

The Hillier Manual of Trees and Shrubs, Ed. John Hillier, David & Charles 2007, 
The Royal Horticultural Society A-Z Encyclopaedia of Garden Plants, Ed. Christopher Bickell, Dorling Kindersley 1996, 

delavayi